The Net Yaroze is a development kit for the PlayStation developed and manufactured by Sony Computer Entertainment as a promotion to computer programming hobbyists, first released in Japan in June 1996 and later across Europe and North America in 1997. The following list contains games and demos developed and/or released for the Net Yaroze.

Conceived by PlayStation creator Ken Kutaragi, the kit was retailed at around £550 in Europe and US$750 in North America; The package contained a special black-colored debugging PlayStation unit, a serial cable for connecting the unit to a PC and a CD containing PlayStation development tools, among other items. However, the Net Yaroze lacked many of the features an official PlayStation SDK provided and its primary RAM size was the same as the consumer model; Game code, graphics, audio samples and run-time libraries were limited to fit in the 2MB of primary RAM, 1MB of VRAM and 0.5 MB of sound RAM, since the unit will not play user-burned CDs, a necessary restriction to prevent piracy and ensure that the Yaroze program would not compete with the official PlayStation SDK. The Yaroze could only be purchased via mail order, although Sony also provided it to universities worldwide. Though it lacked regional lockout, three regional variations exists: The European/Australian version boots in PAL mode, while the Japanese and North American versions boot in NTSC mode. Around 1000 units were sold in Europe and North America respectively but more were sold in Japan.

Many games and demos made by hobbyists on the Net Yaroze were released on various demo discs that came along with magazines such as the Official UK PlayStation Magazine and PlayStation Underground. Sony set up an online forum where users could share their homemade games, programming tips and ask questions to Sony's technical support staff. Dedicated Usenet groups, with access restricted to Yaroze members, were maintained by Sony and homepage hosting was also provided. The access was restricted according to the kit's region of origin, which made collaboration between users in different territories impractical. Other games were also distributed online by their authors.

Games and demos 
There are currently  games and demos on this list.

See also 
 List of PlayStation games (A–L)
 List of PlayStation games (M-Z)
 Lists of video games

Notes

References 

Homebrew software
Net Yaroze